Nymph (Central Figure for "The Three Graces") is a bronze sculpture, by Aristide Maillol.
It was modeled in 1930, and cast in 1953, it is at the Hirshhorn Museum and Sculpture Garden.

In the tradition of the Three Graces in Ancient Roman sculpture, and The Three Graces, by Antonio Canova, it shows serenity, in contrast to his contemporary, Auguste Rodin.

In 1991, it was damaged from blast of a Harrier AV-8B landing as a part of the Gulf War  National Victory Celebration.

See also
 List of public art in Washington, D.C., Ward 2

References

External links
 

Sculptures by Aristide Maillol
1930 sculptures
Hirshhorn Museum and Sculpture Garden
Sculptures of the Smithsonian Institution
Bronze sculptures in Washington, D.C.
Nude sculptures in Washington, D.C.
Outdoor sculptures in Washington, D.C.
Sculptures of women in Washington, D.C.